Pseudophilautus is a genus of shrub frogs in the family Rhacophoridae endemic to the Western Ghats of southwestern India and to Sri Lanka where the majority of the species are found. Many of them are already extinct (marked with † in the species list). On the other, some species believed to be extinct have also been rediscovered.

Reproduction
Frogs in genus Pseudophilautus have direct development: eggs develop directly into froglets that resemble small adults. This strategy makes fully terrestrial reproduction possible. However, the eggs still require high humidity, and periods of dry weather may be detrimental.

The majority of species where reproductive behaviour is known deposit eggs in soil on the forest floor and only one (Pseudophilautus femoralis) on the leaves of understory shrubs. Males use advertisement calls to attract females, and tend to call more intensively during darkness and when humidity is high (e.g., during periods of rainfall). When a male has attracted a female to its vicinity, it approaches the female and enters the amplexus. In ground breeding species, the pair then ascends to the ground, changing colouration to match that of the leaf litter or soil, probably as camouflage. Female locates a suitable spot and excavates a cavity where the eggs are laid. After oviposition, the female mixes the eggs with soil and the male dismounts and returns to a perch. Female also leaves the site after covering the nest; there is no parental care. In leaf nesting species, the overall sequence is similar, but the pair does not change the colour. Eggs are adhesive and deposited to underside of a leaf. The female attends the eggs for few hours after oviposition, apparently to ensure that the eggs are properly attached.

Egg development takes 24–68 days. Pseudophilautus embryos lack external gills but they have a relatively large, vascularized tail. It is probable that embryos use their tail for respiration. Depending on the species, froglets hatch with or without the tail fully absorbed but with the yolk sac still visible.

List of species
The following species are recognised in the genus Pseudophilautus, including eight species described in 2013 by Wickramasinghe and colleagues:

References

 
Rhacophoridae
Amphibians of Asia
Amphibian genera
Taxa named by Raymond Laurent